Transport Layer Security Channel ID (TLS Channel ID, previously known as Transport Layer Security – Origin Bound Certificates TLS-OBC) is a draft RFC proposal Transport Layer Security (TLS) extension that aims to increase TLS security by using certificates on both ends of the TLS connection. Notably, the client is permitted to dynamically create a local, self-signed certificate that provides additional security.

It can also protect users from the related domain cookie attack.

Token Binding
Token Binding is an evolution of the TLS Channel ID feature, and the IETF draft has Microsoft and Google as authors.

References

External links 
 TLS Channel ID IETF Draft
 TLS-OBC for System Administrators

Transport Layer Security